Eusynthemis barbarae is a species of dragonfly of the family Synthemistidae,
known as the Mount Lewis tigertail. 
It is a medium-sized dragonfly with black and yellow markings.
It inhabits rainforest streams in north-eastern Australia

Eusynthemis barbarae appears similar to Eusynthemis guttata which is found in streams of south-eastern Australia.

Gallery

See also
 List of Odonata species of Australia

References

Synthemistidae
Odonata of Australia
Insects of Australia
Endemic fauna of Australia
Taxa named by Maxwell Sydney Moulds
Insects described in 1985